Low Volume Music (2012) is the sixth collaborative album by ambient musicians Steve Roach and Dirk Serries (formerly recording as vidnaObmana or Vidna Obmana). It was their first album after a ten-year hiatus following the release of InnerZone in 2002.

Reception 
AllMusic rated the album a 4 of 5, saying "their work is remarkable, and with Low Volume Music they created yet another standout in 2012".

Hypnagogue praise the album, comparing with Quiet Music and Structures from Silence, concluded "Leave this on repeat for hours. It’s thinking music, it’s sleeping music, it’s being music. Roach and Serries have returned with a disc that sets a fresh standard in the ambient landscape".

Track listing

Personnel 
Adapted from Discogs
 Dirk Serries, Steve Roach – concept, music, producer
 Sam Rosenthal – graphic design
 Martina Verhoeven – photography

References

External links 
 Low Volume Music at Bandcamp
 Low Volume Music at Discogs

2012 albums
Steve Roach (musician) albums
Projekt Records albums